Plexaure may refer to:

Plexaure ("twisting breeze") is one of the Nereids in Greek mythology
Plexaure or Plexaura is also one of the Oceanids in Greek mythology
Plexaure Endl. is a plant taxon synonym with Phreatia, an orchid genus
 Danaus eresimus plexaure is a sub-species of the butterfly Danaus eresimus